Javier Villa García (born 5 October 1987) is a Spanish racing driver living in Arriondas, Asturias, Spain. He drove in the GP2 Series from 2006 towards 2009. In 2010 he switched to touring cars, driving at the Spanish Mini Challenge and later the World Touring Car Championship. Villa finished third at the 2012 Racecar Euro Series stock car championship.

Career

García was born in Colunga, Asturias. Before driving in the GP2 Series in 2006, he raced in the Spanish F3 Championship, where he finished 4th overall in the 2005 season, with the Racing Engineering team.

Graduating to GP2 with Racing Engineering the next year, his first season was pointless, but 2007 was a significant improvement. He took his first GP2 victory in 2007 at the sprint race at Magny-Cours. He started from second on the grid by dint of finishing seventh in the previous day's feature race. He then won the sprint races at the Nürburgring and Hungaroring from pole position. He stayed with Racing Engineering for a third season of GP2 in 2008. This season was disappointing as he slipped back to seventeenth in the championship, whereas team-mate Giorgio Pantano won it.

Villa drove for Super Nova Racing in the 2008–09 GP2 Asia Series season, and also drove for the team in the 2009 GP2 Series season. He was linked with a race seat at Formula One team Campos Grand Prix for 2010 but when they turned into Hispania Racing Team he wasn't linked anymore.

The 2010 season he forged links with BMW driving in the Spanish Mini Challenge Championship. He won that title and was rewarded with a drive in the final round of the 2010 Australian Mini Challenge in Sydney finishing seventh.

In 2011 Villa will move to the World Touring Car Championship with Proteam Motorsport BMW team, where he scored his first podium in Hungary. He had a disappointing end to the season falling out of the top ten finishing 12th for the season. He was voted best rookie in the World Touring Car Championship for the 2011 season.

He was linked with the Formula One team Hispania Racing with a view to replace Vitantonio Liuzzi. He again competed in the Spanish Mini Challenge in 2011 and despite missing three races, still finished in fifth position for the championship.

Villa moved for 2012 to the Racecar Euro Series, a NASCAR-sanctioned stock car championship, where he finished third in the championship with a win and six podium finishes.

Racing record

Complete GP2 Series results
(key) (Races in bold indicate pole position) (Races in italics indicate fastest lap)

Complete GP2 Asia Series results
(key) (Races in bold indicate pole position) (Races in italics indicate fastest lap)

Complete World Touring Car Championship results
(key) (Races in bold indicate pole position) (Races in italics indicate fastest lap)

NASCAR
(key) (Bold – Pole position awarded by qualifying time. Italics – Pole position earned by points standings or practice time. * – Most laps led.)

Whelen Euro Series - Elite 1

References

External links
 Javier Villa Official website
 

1987 births
Living people
Sportspeople from Asturias
Spanish racing drivers
Euroformula Open Championship drivers
GP2 Series drivers
GP2 Asia Series drivers
World Touring Car Championship drivers
NASCAR drivers
International GT Open drivers
People from Oriente (Asturian comarca)
Racing Engineering drivers
Super Nova Racing drivers
Arden International drivers
De Villota Motorsport drivers